Incheh Borun (also Romanized as ‘Īncheh Borūn) is a city and capital of Dashli Borun District, in Gonbad-e Qabus County, Golestan Province, Iran. At the 2006 census its population was 1,764, in 334 families.

References 

Populated places in Gonbad-e Kavus County
Cities in Golestan Province